Anti-Heros were an American Oi!/street punk band formed in 1984 in Georgia, United States. They took a hiatus from 1989 to 1993, but continued to record and play concerts through the early 2000s. Anti-Heros are one of the first and most popular American Oi! bands. The original lineup consisted of Mark Noah (vocals), Jay Jones (bass), Tim Spier (drums) and Joe Winograd (guitar). Phil Solomon replaced Spier on the drums in 1988. The band released two records on Link Records in the late 1980s, That's Right! (produced by John Blackwell) in 1987 and Don't Tread on Me (produced by John Blackwell) in 1988. Link manager Mark Brennan never paid the band for the recordings, which the band members paid to produce.

In February 1997, longtime drummer Phil Solomon left and the band brought on Mark McClusky. Later, Don Shumate (AKA El Guapo, formerly of Time Bomb '77) took over percussion duties

Despite the band's vocal admonishment of racism, their association with such ideals has long been a topic of contention among fans. Their theme song, "Anti-Hero," featured as a standard in their live set, is set to the tune of "Anti-Social," a song by Skrewdriver, one of the first and most prominent white power skinhead bands (although the song has no racist lyrics). The Anti-Heros were involved in a lawsuit against New Line Cinema for using the band's logo in the film American History X against the band's will (as they did not want to be associated with white supremacists). Following the lawsuit, the logo was removed from all subsequent releases of the film.

Their last studio release, 1999's "Underneath the Underground," was produced by Lars Frederiksen of Rancid fame.

Noah owns GMM Records.  GMM Records released some of Dropkick Murphys' earliest recordings, as well as bands such as Iron Cross, Oxymoron, Agnostic Front, The Ducky Boys, The Templars and One Way System.

Discography
That's Right! on LINK Records −1987
Don't Tread On Me on LINK Records −1988
Election Day 7-inch on GMM Records – 1992
That's Right!/Don't Tread On Me multi-CD on GMM Records – 1994
Murder One mini-CD on GMM Records – 1995
American Pie CD and LP on Taang! Records – 1996
Live on a Five 5" on Headache Records – 1997
Truck Stop Toilet split 7-inch with Blanks 77 on Taang! Records – 1997
Anti-Heros vs. Dropkick Murphys split on TKO Records – 1998
Underneath the Underground on GMM Records – 1999
1000 Nights of Chaos LIVE on Taang! Records – 2000

Compilation appearances
U.S. of Oi!, Volume 1 on LINK Records
U.S. of Oi!, Volume 2 on GMM Records
Oi! That's What I Call Music! on LINK Records
Oi! Glorious Oi! on LINK Records
Drunk and Disorderly on Step-1 Records
Backstreets of American Oi! on Sta-Prest Records.
Punk Uprisings Volume 2
Skins and Pins on GMM Records
Punch Drunk on TKO Recordsl

References

Oi! groups
Street punk groups
Punk rock groups from Georgia (U.S. state)
Musical groups established in 1984
1984 establishments in Georgia (U.S. state)